Where the Bears Are is a comedy-mystery web series, which ran for seven seasons from August 1, 2012, to November 1, 2018. The series'  creators and writers Rick Copp and Ben Zook star in the movie together with Joe Dietl.

Described by the creators as a cross between The Golden Girls and Murder, She Wrote, the series focuses on Nelson (Zook), Wood (Dietl) and Reggie (Copp), three gay, bear friends sharing a house in the Silver Lake neighborhood who, in each season, are drawn into a different murder investigation which plays out as a season-long story arc.

Cast

Main

 Rick Copp as Reggie Hatch
 Joe Dietl as Wood Burns
 Ben Zook as Nelson Dorkoff
 Ian Parks as Todd "Hot Toddy" Stevens

Recurring
 Chad Sanders as Det. Chad Winters
 George Unda as Det. Marcus Martinez
 Tim Hooper as the Chief of Police
 George Sebastian as George Ridgemont
 Scott Beauchemin as Cyril Bowers
 Mark Rowe as Jeremy Richards
 Mario Diaz as Ramon Santiago
 Chaz Bono as Gavin Kelly

Guest appearances
Season one
 Tuc Watkins as Dickie Calloway
 Brooke Dillman as Honey Garrett

Season two
 Margaret Cho as Mistress Lena
 Chris LaVoie as Danny Pendleton
 Becky Thyre as Mary Ashley Pendleton

Season three
 Drew Droege as Oscar Butterfield
 Sam Pancake as Alfie Cooper

Season four
 Kevin Chamberlin as Beach Minister

Season five
 Ronnie Kerr as Chase Hansen
 Paolo Andino as Damien Cassidy
 Perez Hilton as Jax

Season six
 Chris Yonan as Prince Omar Al-Fayeed
 Serdar Kalsin as Rami
 Peter Hulne as Nick Flynn
 Jennifer Elise Cox as Laureen Flynn

Season One
In the first season, the bears are caught up in a murder investigation when they find a man dead in their bathtub the morning after Nelson's birthday party. The supporting cast also includes Ian Parks, Mario Diaz, Julio Tello, Jesse Meli, Scott Beauchemin, James Parr, Chad Sanders, George Sebastian, Tuc Watkins, Jackie Beat, Brooke Dillman and Bruce Daniels.

This season was presented as a series of 25 episodes, and a special Christmas episode was produced. Subsequently a DVD was released of the series re-edited into a single, continuous film. The DVD also featured the Christmas special as part of its two-disc set, as well as bloopers and outtakes, deleted scenes, a feature-length commentary and behind-the-scenes interviews with the cast and creators.

The first season was named Best Gay Web Series of 2012 by both AfterElton.com and the LGBT blog Queerty.

Season Two
A crowdfunding campaign was conducted for the second season. On January 17, 2013, the second season started production, and fundraising to finish the series continued.

The second season premiered on June 10, 2013, with a plot in which the bears are again caught in a murder investigation when Elliot Butler (Michael Gans), Reggie's former college roommate and a candidate for city council, turns up dead at his campaign launch party. New cast members in the second season include Howie Skora, Chris Lavoie, Mark Rowe, George Unda, Ray Singh, Shannon Ward and Margaret Cho.

Season Three
The third season, again supported by a crowdfunding campaign on Kickstarter, premiered on August 11, 2014. In the 22-episode third season, Reggie is producing a reality television pilot for a true crime series, and the bears consequently try to solve a string of murders involving models for Chunk Studios, a bear porn studio. New cast additions in the third season include Drew Droege and Sam Pancake.

Season Four
The fourth season premiered on August 24, 2015. Inspired by the non-linear structure of the television series Damages, the fourth season starts with the shooting of Todd at his wedding to Nelson, and then flashes back to tell the story leading to the event.

Season Five
The fifth season premiered on September 1, 2016. It breaks from the murder mystery aspects to switch to a spy narrative, focusing this time on Todd Stevens (Ian Parks) as a newly minted spy for his security agency, setting the bears off on a madcap race to keep a dangerous computer virus from ending up in the wrong hands and sniff out a mole from the agency.

Meanwhile, Wood's and Reggie's love life flares out, George gets engaged to a Sporting Wood model, and Reggie dumps Frank Coley.

Season Six
The sixth season premiered on August 31, 2017. It sees another madcap romp, with Nelson on trial for murder.

Season Seven
The seventh and final season premiered on September 10, 2018. It consisted of 16 episodes with the series finale airing on November 1, 2018.

In 2019, there was a Christmas musical special, described as Hairspray meets It's a Wonderful Life.

References

External links

2012 web series debuts
American LGBT-related web series
American comedy web series
Bear (gay culture)
Mystery web series
LGBT-related comedy films
Kickstarter-funded web series